Pirili is a village in the District of Karaisalı, Adana Province, Turkey.

References

Villages in Karaisalı District